Ilse (minor planet designation: 249 Ilse) is a Main belt asteroid. It has an unusually slow rotation period, about 3.5 days.

It was discovered by C. H. F. Peters on August 16, 1885, in Clinton, New York and was named after Ilse, a legendary German princess.

Due to the long rotation period, a possible asteroidal satellite of Ilse was proposed by R. P. Binzel in 1987 however no evidence of this has been found.

References

External links
 The Asteroid Orbital Elements Database
 Minor Planet Discovery Circumstances
 Asteroid Lightcurve Data File
 
 

Background asteroids
Ilse
Ilse
18850816